The Corbellati Missile is a concept supercar built by Corbellati that is set to be launched in 2019. It was unveiled at the 2018 Geneva Motor Show and is currently in concept phase.

History 

The Missile is built by Corbellati, a Jeweler based in the Canary Islands. It was designed by Achille Corbellati and took inspiration from 1960s racecars.

Performance 
Power goes to the rear wheels through a six-speed manual transmission and a limited slip rear differential. It also features a carbon fiber chassis and body, double wishbone suspension and carbon ceramic disc brakes with six piston calipers. The prototype was hand built by Corbellati and supposedly runs and drives, but its unclear what engine powers it.

References 

Cars introduced in 2018
Rear mid-engine, rear-wheel-drive vehicles